William Edward China  (7 December 1895 – 17 September 1979) was an English entomologist who was a specialist on the bugs (Hemiptera). He served as Keeper of Entomology at the British Museum (Natural History) from 1932 to 1955.

China was born in London and was educated at Cambridge. His education was interrupted by the First World War, during which he served in the army in France and then in the Royal Air Force. He obtained a degree in zoology from Cambridge after the war and then joined the British Museum in 1922 and became keeper of entomology in 1955. He specialized in Hemipteran systematics, publishing nearly 265 papers, describing 98 genera and nearly 248 species. During World War II, he managed the movement of specimens out of London. He obtained a D.Sc. from Cambridge University in 1948. He retired in 1979 to Cornwall.

References 

Entomologists from London
1895 births
1979 deaths
Commanders of the Order of the British Empire
20th-century British zoologists